Mohammad Gulzar Mir is a Pakistani former cricket umpire. He stood in one Test match, Pakistan vs. England, in 1969.

See also
 List of Test cricket umpires

References

External links

Year of birth missing (living people)
Living people
Place of birth missing (living people)
Pakistani Test cricket umpires
Pakistani cricketers
Northern India cricketers
Muslims cricketers
Southern Punjab cricketers
Pakistan Railways cricketers
North Zone (Pakistan) cricketers